Sir Thomas Dyke Acland, 11th Baronet, FRS (25 May 1809 – 29 May 1898) was a British educational reformer and a politician who sat in the House of Commons between 1837 and 1886 initially as a Tory and later, after an eighteen-year gap, as a Liberal.

Early life

Acland was the eldest son of Sir Thomas Dyke Acland, 10th Baronet and his wife Lydia Elizabeth Hoare. Among his siblings was prominent physician, Sir Henry Wentworth Acland, and politician John Acland.

His paternal grandparents were Sir Thomas Acland, 9th Baronet and his wife Henrietta Anne Hoare (daughter of Sir Richard Hoare, 1st Baronet). His maternal grandfather was Henry Hoare of Mitcham Grove of Hoare's Bank.

He was educated at Harrow and Christ Church, Oxford, where he was friends with William Ewart Gladstone and Lord Elgin among others. In 1839 he was made a Fellow of the Royal Society.

Career
In 1837, Acland entered Parliament for Somerset West as a Tory. During the tensions within the Tory party in the 1840s over the Corn Laws, Acland supported Sir Robert Peel's free trade policy. He did not stand for Parliament in the 1847 general election and was to remain out of the House of Commons for nearly twenty years.

Acland showed a strong interest in and commitment to educational reform. He initially promoted the maintenance and defence of church schools and the establishment of diocesan theological colleges. However, he later became a supporter of educational projects of a more Liberal character and played a leading role in the establishment of the Oxford local examinations system in 1858. He was also involved in agricultural issues and was a Trustee of the Royal Agricultural Society. Acland was influential in the recruitment of Augustus Voelcker as consultant agricultural chemist to the Royal Bath and West of England Society around 1849. Acland served as a major in the Royal 1st Devonshire Yeomanry Cavalry, and when the 1st Administrative Battalion, Devonshire Rifle Volunteer Corps, was formed at Exeter in August 1860, he became its Lieutenant-Colonel. In 1881, when it became the 3rd Volunteer Battalion, Devonshire Regiment, he was made its Honorary Colonel. He was also a J.P. for Devon and Somerset. He contested Birmingham as a moderate Liberal in 1859, but was defeated by John Bright.

In 1865, Acland returned to the House of Commons as a Liberal when he was elected as one of two representatives for Devonshire North. Between 1869 and 1874, he served as a Church Estates Commissioner. He never held ministerial office but was sworn of the Privy Council in 1883. The Devonshire North constituency was abolished by the Redistribution of Seats Act of 1885 and Acland was instead returned to Parliament for Wellington. He voted for the First Home Rule Bill in June 1885 and this led to him being defeated at the 1886 general election.

Apart from his public career Acland was also a patron of art. He was a friend of John Ruskin and an early admirer of John Everett Millais.

Personal life
Acland married firstly Mary Mordaunt, daughter of Sir Charles Mordaunt, 8th Baronet, in 1841. Before her death in 1851, they had three sons and two daughters, including:

 Sir Thomas Dyke Acland, 12th Baronet (1842–1919), who married Gertrude Walrond, a daughter of Sir John Walrond, 1st Baronet.
 Mary Lydia Acland (b. 1846), who married the Rev. Richard Hart-Davis in 1872.
 Sir Arthur Dyke Acland, 13th Baronet (1847–1926), who married Alice Cunningham, a daughter of Rev. Francis Macaulay Cunningham.
 Agnes Henrietta Acland (1851–1935), who married Frederick Henry Anson, son of Rev. Frederick Anson.

He married secondly Mary Erskine, only surviving child of John Erskine, in 1856. This marriage was childless. Lady Acland died in May 1892.

Acland survived her by six years and died in May 1898, aged 89. He was succeeded in the baronetcy by his eldest son Thomas, who was also a politician. Acland's second son Arthur, who succeeded to the baronetcy in 1919, also had a successful political career.

Notes

References

Kidd, Charles, Williamson, David (editors). Debrett's Peerage and Baronetage (1990 edition). New York: St Martin's Press, 1990,

External links

 
 

1809 births
1898 deaths
Thomas Dyke 1809
People educated at Harrow School
Alumni of Christ Church, Oxford
Baronets in the Baronetage of England
Fellows of the Royal Society
UK MPs 1837–1841
UK MPs 1841–1847
UK MPs 1865–1868
UK MPs 1868–1874
UK MPs 1874–1880
UK MPs 1880–1885
UK MPs 1885–1886
Conservative Party (UK) MPs for English constituencies
Liberal Party (UK) MPs for English constituencies
Royal 1st Devon Yeomanry officers
Members of the Privy Council of the United Kingdom
Presidents of the Oxford Union
Church Estates Commissioners